John Kerr Sr. (15 October 1943 – 19 June 2011) was a North American Soccer League soccer midfielder. Born in Scotland, he played for the Canada men's national team.

Player

Professional
Kerr began his professional career with Partick Thistle in Scotland. When his mother moved to Canada, Kerr followed and emigrated to the Toronto area before signing with the Hamilton Steelers/Primos in the Eastern Canada Professional Soccer League and later in the National Soccer League (NSL). He also played with Hamilton Croatia in the NSL. In 1968, he played in the North American Soccer League with the Detroit Cougars. In 1969, he joined the Washington Darts of the second division American Soccer League where he was a First Team All Star. The Darts moved up to the NASL in 1970 and Kerr remained with the team through the 1971 season. He was the league's 14th leading scorer with Washington in 1971 with 18 points in 24 games. He scored Washington only goal of the NASL's first-ever indoor tournament in 1971. He also played for New York Hota of the German American Soccer League when it won the 1971 National Challenge Cup. He also played for Club América of Mexico in the early 1970s. In 1972, Kerr became a member of the New York Cosmos. In 1972, he was again the league's 14th top scorer with 10 points in 14 games with the Cosmos and was named league First Team All-Star at midfield. He then played the 1976 and 1977 seasons with the Washington Diplomats, serving during the 1977 season as an assistant coach. However, on 17 July 1977, the Dips informed Kerr that the team planned to release him.

National team
Kerr played ten times for Canada, four times in World Cup qualifying in 1968, five times in W.C. qualifying in 1976 and once in a 1977 friendly. Canada failed to qualify for either World Cup.

Coach
Kerr coached the Georgetown University freshman soccer team in 1970 and then coached the American Eagles men's soccer team in 1971. Kerr took the amateur Fairfax Spartans to the 1986 National Amateur Cup. In 1987, the Spartans became known as F.C. Washington and later the Washington Stars as it entered the American Soccer League. Kerr was hired as head coach of the Stars on 24 June 1987. He coached the Stars until the team folded following the 1990 American Professional Soccer League season. Kerr was head coach of the Richmond Kickers in 1993–94.

He was the Major League Soccer's Players Association executive director during the late 1990s.

Kerr coached the varsity boys' team at Hilton Head High School in Hilton Head Island, South Carolina in the mid-2000s. At the time of his death, Kerr was coaching for Triangle Futbol Club in Raleigh, North Carolina.

Personal
In 2008, Kerr was inducted into the Virginia-DC Soccer Hall of Fame. In 2015 Kerr was inducted as a builder into the Canadian Soccer Hall of Fame. Kerr's son John Kerr Jr. is a former American international.

References

External links
 
 NASL stats
 

1943 births
2011 deaths
Canadian soccer players
Canadian expatriate soccer players
Canada men's international soccer players
Canadian National Soccer League players 
Canadian soccer coaches
Canada Soccer Hall of Fame inductees
American Professional Soccer League coaches
American Soccer League (1988–89) coaches
American Soccer League (1933–1983) players
Association football midfielders
Canadian expatriate sportspeople in the United States
Club América footballers
Detroit Cougars (soccer) players
Eastern Canada Professional Soccer League players
Expatriate soccer players in the United States
German-American Soccer League players
Hamilton Croatia players
Hamilton Steelers (ECPSL) players
Naturalized citizens of Canada
Expatriate footballers in Mexico
Canadian expatriate sportspeople in Mexico
Liga MX players
New York Cosmos players
New York Hota players
North American Soccer League (1968–1984) players
North American Soccer League (1968–1984) indoor players
Footballers from Glasgow
Soccer players from Toronto
Scottish emigrants to Canada
Scottish footballers
USISL coaches
Washington Darts players
Washington Diplomats (NASL) players
Richmond Kickers coaches
American Eagles men's soccer coaches